William Wynne (born January 30, 1990) is an American hurdler who specializes in the 400 metre hurdles. He currently holds the world youth best in the 400 m hurdles (84 cm) with a time of 49.01 seconds, 0.85 seconds under the previous record set by South Africa's Marnus Kritzinger in 1999. He won two gold medals and a silver medal at the 2007 World Youth Championships in Athletics, which also earned him the 2007 USATF Youth Athlete of the Year award. Wynne is a graduate of McEachern High School in Powder Springs, Georgia.

References

External links

DyeStat profile for William Wynne
Florida Gators bio

1990 births
Living people
Sportspeople from Marietta, Georgia
American male hurdlers
Florida Gators men's track and field athletes
Track and field athletes from Georgia (U.S. state)